Sardar Dost Muhammad Mazari (born 15 August 1980) is a Pakistani politician who served as the Deputy Speaker of the Provincial Assembly of Punjab, from August 2018 to July 2022 before being removed via a motion of no confidence. He had been a member of the Provincial Assembly of Punjab from August 2018 till January 2023. Previously, he was a member of the National Assembly of Pakistan from 2008 to 2013.

Political career
He was elected to the National Assembly of Pakistan from Constituency NA-175 (Rajanpur-II) as a candidate of Pakistan Peoples Party (PPP) in 2008 Pakistani general election. He received 78,427 votes and defeated Sardar Nasrullah Khan Dreshak.

He ran for the seat of the National Assembly from Constituency NA-175 (Rajanpur-II) as an independent candidate in 2013 Pakistani general election but was unsuccessful. He received 73,885 votes and lost the seat to Hafeez Ur Rehman.

He was elected to the Provincial Assembly of the Punjab as a candidate of Pakistan Tehreek-e-Insaf (PTI) from Constituency PP-297 (Rajanpur-V) in 2018 Pakistani general election. Following his successful election, PTI named him for the office of Deputy Speaker of the Punjab Assembly. On 16 August 2018, he was elected as Deputy Speaker of the Punjab Assembly. He received 187 votes against his opponent Malik Muhammad Waris Kallu who secured 159 votes.

On 6 April 2022, a no confidence motion was filed against him by the his own party due to circumstances arising from the 2022 constitutional crisis in Punjab, Pakistan. The motion was tabled on 29 July 2022, which led to Mazari's removal by 186 votes.

References

1980 births
Living people
Dost
Baloch politicians
Pakistani MNAs 2008–2013
Punjab MPAs 2018–2023
Pakistan Tehreek-e-Insaf MPAs (Punjab)
Deputy Speakers of the Provincial Assembly of the Punjab